= Fonso Branch =

Stream in the American state of Missouri

Coordinates: 38°51′06″N 91°37′14″W

Fonso Branch (also called Fonso Creek) is a stream in the U.S. state of Missouri.

Fonso Branch has the name of Alfonso "Fonso" Boone, a pioneer citizen.

== See also ==
- List of rivers of Missouri
